Chrysaor was the brother of Pegasus in Greek mythology.

Chrysaor may also refer to:
 Chrysaor (sword), weapon of Sir Artegall in Edmund Spenser's poem The Faerie Queene
 Chrysaor Krishna, one of Poseidon's Mariners in the manga Saint Seiya
 Chrysaor, junior synonym of Empyreuma, genus of tiger moths in the family Erebidae
 Chrysaor, hydrocarbon company and holder of the Everest gasfield UK exploration rights
 Chrysaor, gasfield in the Gorgon gas project, Western Australia

Similar spellings
 Chrysaora (common name sea nettle), a genus of jellyfish in the family Pelagiidae
 Ancient Greek towns in Caria, now western Anatolia, Turkey:
 Chrysaoris
 Chrysaorium